Carpathonesticus zaitzevi  is an araneomorph spider species of the family Nesticidae that occurs in Georgia. It was transferred from the genus Nesticus to Carpathonesticus in 1996.

Description
Female specimens of C. zaitzevi have an orange-yellow prosoma with a length of 1.9–2.55 mm. The cephalic part of the prosoma is shining. The sternum is orange-yellow and sparsely covered with short and long setae. The opisthosoma is covered with grey setae. The dorsum has two triangular marks, or occasionally five pairs of marks. In some cases, the marks are absent.

Male specimens have a prosoma length of 1.8–2.3 mm. Males are coloured like females, but the opisthosomal markings are more pronounced.

Original publication

References 

Nesticidae
Spiders of Georgia (country)
Spiders described in 1939